

Plant, soil, and microbial sciences